Czerwin  is a village in Ostrołęka County, Masovian Voivodeship, in east-central Poland. It is the seat of the gmina (administrative district) called Gmina Czerwin.

The village has a population of 800.

External links
 Jewish Community in Czerwin on Virtual Shtetl

References

Czerwin
Łomża Governorate
Warsaw Voivodeship (1919–1939)